The CEO Pay Ratio is a wage ratio. Pursuant to Section 953(b) of the Dodd-Frank Wall Street Reform and Consumer Protection Act, publicly traded companies are required to disclose (1) the median total annual compensation of all employees other than the CEO and (2) the ratio of the CEO's annual total compensation to that of the median employee, (3) the wage ratio of the CEO to the median employee.

The proxy season 2018 was the first year that CEO Pay Ratio data was publicly available.

See also
Dodd-Frank Wall Street Reform and Consumer Protection Act
Executive compensation
Compensation in the United States
Gini coefficient
Remuneration
Wage ratio
Distribution of wealth

Notes

References

External links
 The “Pay Ratio Provision” in the Dodd-Frank Act: Legislation to Repeal It in the 113th Congress. Congressional Research Service.

Employee compensation in the United States
Executive compensation